Jens Lauritz Arup (20 April 1793 – 9 April 1874)  was a Norwegian bishop and politician.

He was born at Kristiansand in Vest-Agder, Norway. His father was a sexton and a school teacher. In 1811 Arup was sent to Copenhagen to study, but had to end his studies due to lack of funds. After returning to Norway he worked for a while as a teacher, until he could take his theological exam at the Royal Frederick University (now University of Oslo). In the following years he worked in Ullensaker, Drammen and Bragernes. He was made Bishop of Kristiania in 1846, and remained in the position until 1874.

Arup was also involved in politics, and in 1836 he was elected into the Norwegian Parliament (Stortinget) for Drammen constituency, where he was reelected in 1839, 1842 and 1845. He was later appointed temporarily councillor of state in interim for the Norwegian government in Sweden in the years 1852–53, 1857 and 1861. In 1860, Arup crowned Charles XV of Sweden king of Norway at Nidarosdomen in Trondheim.

He was a proponent of religious toleration for Protestant dissenters as both a bishop and politician, helping to pass legislation towards this goal in 1845. He was also in favour of greater liberty from the state for the Norwegian church.

References

1793 births
1874 deaths
Politicians from Kristiansand
University of Oslo alumni
Bishops of Oslo
Government ministers of Norway
Members of the Storting